Spellbound is the second studio album by American singer Paula Abdul, released in May 1991. The album was an international success and spawned major radio hits with the singles "Rush Rush", "The Promise of a New Day", "Blowing Kisses in the Wind", "Vibeology" and "Will You Marry Me?". The album went triple platinum in the United States and peaked at No. 1 on the Billboard 200.

Spellbound won a Grammy Award for Best Recording Package. The album art was art directed by Melanie Nissen, designed by Inge Schaap, and lettered by Margo Chase.

Critical reception
In 2003, staff at Slant Magazine included Spellbound in its list of "50 Essential Pop Albums".

Commercial performance
The album debuted at number five on the Billboard 200 in its first week and rose four spots to number one the following week. It stayed at the summit for two consecutive weeks, selling 88,000 and 89,000 units respectively. The album distinguished itself by becoming the lowest selling number-one album in the Nielsen SoundScan era at the time of its release—a distinction it held until 2004, when Outkast's Speakerboxxx/The Love Below sold 86,000 copies while at number one. This was primarily due to the newly implemented SoundScan tracking system, which had not been implemented into every major music chain, thus sales were not entirely accurate. Nevertheless, the album became a best-seller and emerged as the best selling album for the month of June, spending 16 weeks within the top 10, and was certified three-times platinum by the RIAA in January 1992. Overall, the album spent 70 weeks on the Billboard 200 chart and was ranked as the 18th best-seller of the year.

Track listing

Notes
 denotes a song mixed using QSound.

Production
Produced by Peter Lord, Paisley Park, V. Jeffrey Smith, Jorge Corante and Don Was
Engineers: Wolfgang Aichholz, Ed Cherney, Don Feinerg, Arne Frager, Rod Hull, Michael Koppelman, Greg Laney, Dave Pensado

Personnel
Paula Abdul – lead vocals, Synclavier II
Sweet Pea Atkinson, Sir Harry Bowens, Sally Dworsky, Colin England, The Family Stand, Peter Lord, Arnold McCuller, Sandra St. Victor – backing vocals
Mike Campbell, Mark Goldenberg, Randy Jacobs, Clifford Moonie Pusey, V. Jeffrey Smith – guitar
Jorge Corante, Tom Hammer, Peter Lord, Ivan Neville, V. Jeffrey Smith – keyboards
Jamie Muhoberac – organ
Tim Drummond – bass
Curt Bisquera, Rocky Bryant – drums
Paulinho Da Costa – percussion
Greg Adams – trumpet
Steve Grove – tenor saxophone
Stephen Kupka – baritone saxophone
Stevie Wonder – harmonica
Stuart Canin – violin
Billy Heaslip – lighting director
Robert Lobetta – photography

Charts

Weekly charts

Year-end charts

Certifications

References

1991 albums
Paula Abdul albums
Virgin Records albums
New jack swing albums
Hip hop soul albums
Albums produced by Don Was
Albums produced by Prince (musician)
Albums recorded at Greene St. Recording
Albums recorded at Sunset Sound Recorders